Alice Springs Airport  is an Australian regional airport  south of Alice Springs, Northern Territory.  The airport was notably involved in Australia's first domestic airline hijacking, and later a suicide attack by a former airline employee which claimed the lives of four others.

The airport has two runways, the larger of which can accommodate the Airbus A380, Boeing 747 and 777 landing (but not a fully laden takeoff due to high temperatures and the runway length).  The only scheduled flights using the airport are domestic, although international charters do use the airport on occasions.  The airport is not subject to a curfew and operates 24 hours a day.

During 2010–11 a total of 640,519 domestic passengers passed through Alice Springs Airport making it the 18th busiest airport in Australia.

The facility is also extensively used to launch stratospheric research balloons; the runways used for a balloon launch are closed for aircraft traffic during the balloon launch process.

History

On 5 October 1921 the first aircraft landed at the original airport located in the Alice Springs township. Connellan Airways (later to become Connair) was based there from 1939. The military buildup in the north of Australia in the late 1930s saw the need for an airport that could take larger and heavier aircraft. This led to the construction of Seven Mile Aerodrome and the diminished role of the Town Site Drome from 1946 until its eventual abandonment in 1968. It is now the site of the Central Australian Aviation Museum.  The original North South runway was along Memorial Drive, which runs along the front of the Aviation museum, whereas the original East West runway was along the nearby residential street of Van Senden Avenue

Seven Mile Aerodrome was originally built in 1940 by the Australian Department of Defence and was used primarily by the Royal Australian Air Force and the United States Air Force, to bring troops and supplies into the area. The airport became the main transit base for RAAF transport planes during World War II. Several civilian aircraft were permitted at the airport, but during the war its primary purpose was military as a refuelling and staging facility, as the airport was strategically located near the Pacific Theater of Operations. No. 57 Operational Base Unit (RAAF) ran and maintained the aerodrome.

In 1958 it officially became Alice Springs Airport.

Units based at Seven Mile Aerodrome
 No. 57 Operational Base Unit RAAF ran and maintained the aerodrome during World War II.
 No. 87 Squadron RAAF was based at the aerodrome for a period of time to undertake aerial topographic survey work during World War II.

1972 hijacking

Alice Springs Airport was the site of the resolution of Australia's second domestic aircraft hijacking. On 15 November 1972, an Ansett Fokker F27 Friendship was hijacked after taking off from Adelaide Airport. The hijacker, Miloslav Hrabinec, threatened the pilot with a rifle and demanded to be given a parachute and flown to the desert. He was convinced to allow the plane to land at its intended destination of Alice Springs, where he engaged in a shoot-out with Northern Territory Police, critically wounding a police officer before shooting himself in the head.

1977 suicide pilot

Tragedy struck the airport again over four years later on 5 January 1977, when a former employee of Connair, Colin Richard Forman, flew a stolen aircraft into the Connair offices (formerly Connellan Airways) located at the airport, killing himself and three of the airline's employees. A woman working in the offices suffered severe burns and died several days later.

Privatisation
On 1 April 1989 the Federal Airports Corporation (FAC) assumed control of the airport. On 10 June 1998, the Government of Australia granted a 50-year lease plus a 49-year option to Northern Territory Airports Pty Ltd. Northern Territory Airports is 100% owned by Airport Developments Group (which also operates Tennant Creek Airport). Northern Territory Airports Pty Ltd has 100% ownership of Alice Springs Airport Pty Ltd (along with the Darwin International Airport).

Asia Pacific Aircraft Storage
 

On 27 May 2011 it was announced that Alice Springs Airport had been selected to be the first large-scale aircraft boneyard outside the United States.

The facility, which commenced operation in June 2014, is operated by Asia Pacific Aircraft Storage Ltd. APAS chose Alice Springs because its dry, arid climate is perfect for aircraft storage and preservation. The facility will store commercial aircraft not in use, as well as those planes that have been decommissioned from service and which will be stripped of parts to be recycled, such as engines, electronics and wiring.

As a result of the COVID-19 pandemic, various overseas airlines including Singapore Airlines, Scoot, NokScoot, Fiji Airways, Cebu Pacific, Garuda Indonesia and Cathay Pacific are storing their aircraft in the facility.

On 30 September 2020 it was announced that the facility was close to its current capacity, and would be expanded from around 100 aircraft to up to 200 aircraft. In the meantime APAS would be storing aircraft at Toowoomba Wellcamp Airport.

Airlines and destinations

Statistics

Accidents and incidents
 On 15 November 1972, an Ansett Fokker F27 Friendship operating as flight 232 was hijacked after taking off from Adelaide Airport. After being persuaded to allow the plane to land at Alice Springs, the hijacker killed himself after a brief shoot-out with police.
 The Connellan air disaster occurred on 5 January 1977, claiming the lives of the suicidal pilot and four on the ground.
 A Pel-Air IAI 1124 Westwind operating a cargo flight from Tindal Airport crashed into the Ilparpa Range while attempting an instrument approach for runway 12 on 27 April 1995, killing the two pilots and a company passenger.
 On 16 December 2000, a mentally ill man broke into the hangar of the Alice Springs Aero Club, climbed into a Piper Warrior aeroplane belonging to the club and was able to start the engine. Despite having no formal flight training, the man was able to taxi the aircraft to the runway and take off under the cover of darkness at around 5am. The accident was investigated by the Northern Territory Police and evidence heard during the subsequent coronial inquiry revealed the offender had on a previous occasion been apprehended at Darwin International Airport while attempting to steal an aircraft after absconding from a mental health facility. He told authorities he wanted to steal a plane to "fly back to God". It is believed he acquired a key at this time which he later used to start the plane he successfully stole and crashed.

See also
 List of airports in the Northern Territory

References

Bushmag:The Silent Grief of Alice Springs

External links

Official website
Asia Pacific Aircraft Storage Official Website
History of the stratospheric balloon launch base located in the Alice Spring airport and records of balloons launched there

Airports in the Northern Territory
Transport in Alice Springs
Buildings and structures in Alice Springs
Airports established in 1921
Airports established in 1940
1921 establishments in Australia